Abel Echeverría Pineda (born 26 August 1954) is a Mexican politician affiliated with the Institutional Revolutionary Party.  he served as Deputy of the LIX Legislature of the Mexican Congress representing Guerrero, and previously served in the LVI Legislature of the Congress of Guerrero.

References

1954 births
Living people
Politicians from Guerrero
Members of the Congress of Guerrero
Institutional Revolutionary Party politicians
Universidad Autónoma Metropolitana alumni
National Autonomous University of Mexico alumni
20th-century Mexican politicians
21st-century Mexican politicians
Deputies of the LIX Legislature of Mexico
Members of the Chamber of Deputies (Mexico) for Guerrero